This list of introduced bird species includes all the species of bird introduced to an area without regard to that territory being or not being their native area of occupation or the success of that re-introduction or introduction to the area. This practice has been harmful in many areas, although some introductions are made with the aim of preserving bird species. Following the name of the bird, a brief description of where they were introduced is included.

Struthioniformes

Struthionidae
Ostrich, successfully introduced to Australia, and possibly introduced to New Mexico (captive only) and Israel

Casuariformes

Casuariidae
Emu, successfully introduced to Kangaroo Island, South Australia, Tasmania and possibly introduced to Texas

Rheiformes

Rheidae
Greater rhea, successfully introduced to France (captive only), and Germany (by accident)
Lesser rhea, successfully introduced to Tierra del Fuego

Apterygiformes

Apterygidae
Tokoeka, successfully introduced to Kapiti Island and Little Barrier Island, New Zealand
Little spotted kiwi, successfully introduced to Kapiti Island, New Zealand

Tinamiformes

Tinamidae
Chilean tinamou, introduced successfully to Easter Island and unsuccessfully to the Hawaiian Islands
Great tinamou, unsuccessfully introduced to Sapelo Island, Georgia, US
Red-winged tinamou, unsuccessfully introduced to the United States

Anseriformes

Anatidae
Trumpeter swan, re-introduced successfully to areas of the United States and Canada
Mute swan, introduced successfully to North America, New Zealand, Australia, South Africa, United Arab Emirates and Japan introduced unsuccessfully to the Hawaiian Islands
Black swan, successfully introduced to the Netherlands, United Arab Emirates and Japan; unsuccessfully introduced to Tahiti and Hawaiian Islands
Swan goose, a domesticated breed that can become feral, but which has difficulty in becoming established. Feral populations known in Europe possibly unsuccessfully introduced to Hawaii
Spur-winged goose, unsuccessfully introduced to Western Australia
Cape Barren goose, introduced unsuccessfully to New Zealand; re-introduced successfully to King Island in Bass Strait
Snow goose, unsuccessfully introduced to New Zealand
Emperor goose, successfully introduced to England
Bar-headed goose, successfully to Canada and much of Europe
Greylag goose, successfully introduced to England and Falkland Islands (is a native rare-breeder in northern Scotland); successfully introduced to New Zealand. Possibly successfully introduced ferally in Colombia and elsewhere in the Andes
Canada goose, successfully introduced to Great Britain, Ireland, Sweden, Denmark, Japan, and New Zealand; successfully re-introduced to some areas of the United States and Canada; unsuccessfully introduced to the Hawaiian Islands and Western Australia
Barnacle goose, successfully introduced to southern England
Hawaiian goose, re-introduced successfully to Hawaii and Maui in the Hawaiian Islands; possibly introduced unsuccessfully to New Zealand
Magellan goose, unsuccessfully introduced to South Georgia Island
Australian wood duck, possibly introduced unsuccessfully to the Hawaiian Islands and New Zealand
Black-bellied whistling duck, unsuccessfully introduced to Cuba and Jamaica
White-faced whistling duck, possibly introduced successfully in Costa Rica; unsuccessfully introduced to Mauritius
Egyptian goose, successfully introduced to eastern England, occasionally feral in Europe; introduced unsuccessfully to New Zealand, Australia, and the United States
Muscovy duck, feral in many parts of the world; introduced successfully to areas of the United States and Britain; introduced unsuccessfully to Adams Island, New Zealand
Mallard, successfully introduced to the eastern United States, Bermuda, Australia, New Zealand, the Falkland Islands, Macquarie Island, Colombia, South Africa, possibly the Falkland Islands and Kerguelen; introduced successfully to the Hawaiian Islands though also a vagrant, introduced unsuccessfully to Tahiti
Hawaiian duck, re-introduced successfully to the Hawaiian Islands
Meller's duck, possibly successfully introduced to Mauritius; unsuccessfully introduced to Réunion
Blue-winged teal, possibly introduced to the Hawaiian Islands
Northern pintail, successfully introduced to Île Saint-Paul and Amsterdam Island in the southern Indian Ocean; unsuccessfully introduced to New Zealand
Eurasian wigeon, unsuccessfully introduced to New Zealand
Gadwall, possibly unsuccessfully introduced to New Zealand
Mandarin duck, successfully introduced to England, Europe and the United States, unsuccessfully introduced to Australia, New Zealand and Tahiti
Red-crested pochard, successfully introduced to England
Pochard, unsuccessfully introduced to New Zealand
Tufted duck, unsuccessfully introduced to New Zealand; occasionally feral in the United States
Ruddy duck, successfully introduced to Great Britain, and range has since expanded into Europe and North Africa

Galliformes

Megapodidae
Malleefowl, possibly introduced successfully to parts of Queensland, unsuccessfully introduced to Kangaroo Island and Rottnest Island, Australia
Australian brushturkey, introduced unsuccessfully to Kangaroo Island and Dunk Island in Australia

Cracidae
Plain chachalaca, successfully introduced to Sapelo Island and possibly Blackbeard Island, Georgia, US
Black curassow, possibly introduced unsuccessfully to Haiti and New Zealand
Great curassow, unsuccessfully introduced to the Hawaiian Islands, Haiti, the United States, Panama
Crested guan, unsuccessfully introduced to the Hawaiian Islands
Rufous-vented chachalaca, possibly introduced (possibly colonised) to the Grenadines, Bequia, Union Island and Saint Vincent in the Caribbean
Chestnut-winged chachalaca, probably unsuccessfully introduced to the Hawaiian Islands

Tetraonidae
Capercaillie, successfully re-introduced to Scotland and possibly to some parts of mainland Europe; unsuccessfully introduced to North America
Eurasian black grouse, re-introduced successfully to areas of Great Britain, and possibly Poland and Russia; unsuccessfully introduced to Ireland, North America and New Zealand
Willow grouse, possibly re-introduced successfully to Poland; unsuccessfully introduced to New Zealand, Fiji and the United States. Subspecies l.l.scoticus (red grouse) introduced to southern England (Dartmoor, Exmoor, unsuccessfully introduced to Belgium
Rock ptarmigan, unsuccessfully introduced to Japan and possibly New Zealand
Dusky grouse, introduced (status uncertain) to several islands in the Gulf of Alaska
Spruce grouse, possibly successfully introduced to Newfoundland, Kodiak and Woody Island
Hazel grouse, unsuccessfully introduced to the United States and possibly Poland
Ruffed grouse, successfully introduced to Michigan, Missouri and Nevada, unsuccessfully elsewhere in the United States; successfully introduced to Anticosti Island and Newfoundland in Canada. 
Greater sage grouse, unsuccessfully re-introduced to New Mexico, unsuccessfully introduced to Montana and British Columbia
Sharp-tailed grouse, unsuccessfully introduced to the Hawaiian Islands and New Zealand
Greater prairie chicken, unsuccessfully introduced to areas of the United States, the Hawaiian Islands and New Zealand
Lesser prairie chicken, unsuccessfully introduced to the Hawaiian Islands

Phasianidae
Himalayan snowcock, introduced successfully to the United States
Chukar, introduced successfully to Russia, the United States, Canada, Mexico, the Hawaiian Islands, New Zealand, St Helena, and possibly Australia, Eleuthera in the Bahamas, and South Africa; unsuccessfully introduced to France, Ukraine, and Alaska, widely released and feral in Great Britain
See-see partridge, introduced unsuccessfully to the United States and the Hawaiian Islands
Sand partridge, introduced unsuccessfully to Cyprus
Snow partridge, introduced unsuccessfully to the Hawaiian Islands and the United States
Red-legged partridge, introduced successfully to Great Britain, the Azores, Madeira, France, the Netherlands, Belgium, Germany, and possibly the Balearic Islands in the Mediterranean, the Canary Islands, Porto Santo, and northern Spain and Portugal; unsuccessfully introduced to the United States, the Hawaiian Islands, Australia and New Zealand
Barbary partridge, introduced successfully to the Canary Islands and Gibraltar, and possibly Sardegna; unsuccessfully introduced to Great Britain, New Zealand, Australia, the United States and the Hawaiian Islands
Arabian partridge, possibly unsuccessfully introduced to Eritrea
Black francolin, introduced successfully to the United States, the Hawaiian Islands, and Guam; possibly unsuccessfully introduced to Saudi Arabia
Chinese francolin, successfully introduced to Mauritius, the Philippines, and possibly Madagascar and the Seychelles; unsuccessfully introduced to Oman, Réunion and the Hawaiian Islands
Grey francolin, successfully introduced to the Amirante Islands, the Hawaiian Islands, the Seychelles, Rodrigues and possibly Mauritius, Réunion, and the United States; unsuccessfully introduced to Diego Garcia in the Chagos Archipelago and to the Andaman Islands
Red-billed francolin, introduced, perhaps successfully, to Hawaii in the Hawaiian Islands
Heuglin's francolin, unsuccessfully introduced to the Hawaiian Islands
Clapperton's francolin, unsuccessfully introduced to the Hawaiian Islands
Erckel's francolin, successfully introduced to the Hawaiian Islands; unsuccessfully introduced to the United States
Red-necked francolin, successfully introduced to Ascension Island
Yellow-necked francolin, unsuccessfully introduced to the Hawaiian Islands
Grey partridge, successfully re-introduced to Russia, Finland, France and Italy; successfully introduced to the United States and Canada; unsuccessfully introduced to the Inner Hebrides, the Orkney Islands, the Outer Hebrides, Norway, the Hawaiian Islands, Fiji, Australia, Tasmania, New Zealand, and Chile
Daurian partridge, successfully introduced to the Philippines; unsuccessfully introduced to Japan
Madagascar partridge, unsuccessfully introduced to Mauritius and Réunion
Common quail, introduced successfully to Réunion; introduced unsuccessfully to the United States and Tahiti; possibly introduced unsuccessfully to Australia, New Zealand, the Seychelles, Mauritius and France
Japanese quail, introduced successfully to the Hawaiian Islands; introduced unsuccessfully to the United States
Stubble quail, unsuccessfully introduced to New Zealand and the Hawaiian Islands
Brown quail, successfully introduced to New Zealand
Asian blue quail, successfully introduced to Guam; unsuccessfully introduced to Mauritius, Réunion, the Hawaiian Islands, and possibly New Zealand and the United States
Jungle bush quail, unsuccessfully introduced to Mauritius and Réunion
Taiwan partridge (also called Taiwan hill partridge, unsuccessfully introduced to Japan
Crested wood partridge, unsuccessfully introduced to the Hawaiian Islands
Chinese bamboo partridge, successfully introduced to Japan; unsuccessfully introduced to the United States, Russia and the Hawaiian Islands
Temminck's tragopan, possibly introduced unsuccessfully to New Zealand
Himalayan monal, unsuccessfully introduced to Australia and France
Brown eared pheasant, introduced unsuccessfully to Alaska
Silver pheasant, unsuccessfully introduced to New Zealand, Australia, the Hawaiian Islands, the United States, Canada, France, Great Britain, Russia, and Colombia
Kalij pheasant, successfully introduced to the Hawaiian Islands; unsuccessfully introduced to the United States and Alaska
Swinhoe's pheasant, unsuccessfully introduced to Japan
Crested fireback, unsuccessfully introduced to Australia
Red junglefowl, successfully introduced in Micronesia, Melanesia, Polynesia, Réunion, the Grenadines, Australia, Hawaiian Islands, the United States, and South Africa; possibly introduced to the Philippines, much of Indonesia; unsuccessfully introduced to Hispaniola, Glorioso Islands, Chagos Archipelago, St Helena, Trinidad, New Zealand, and France
Green junglefowl, successfully introduced to the Cocos-Keeling Islands
Grey junglefowl, unsuccessfully introduced to the Hawaiian Islands
Cheer pheasant, unsuccessfully introduced to Europe and Alaska
Common pheasant, successfully introduced to Europe, North America, the Hawaiian Islands, New Zealand, Japan, St Helena, and on King Island, Rottnest Island and Tasmania, Australia; unsuccessfully introduced to mainland Australia, the Dominican Republic, Panama, Pitcairn Island, Taiwan, Madeira, Alaska, Bermuda, Peru, Tahiti, Mauritius, Kangaroo Island, Chile, and Cyprus
Green pheasant, successfully introduced to the Hawaiian Islands
Reeves's pheasant, successfully introduced to France; unsuccessfully introduced to the Hawaiian Islands, Great Britain, Ireland, the United States, Alaska, and New Zealand
Copper pheasant, unsuccessfully introduced to the Hawaiian Islands and the United States
Golden pheasant, successfully introduced to Great Britain; unsuccessfully introduced to the United States, Canada, the Hawaiian Islands, New Zealand, Colombia, and Tahiti
Lady Amherst's pheasant, successfully introduced to England, but now locally extinct; unsuccessfully introduced to the Hawaiian Islands, Colombia and possibly New Zealand
Indian peafowl, successfully introduced to Pakistan, Japan, California, Hawaiian Islands, Andaman Islands, New Zealand, Rottnest Island, Heron Island, King Island in Australia; unsuccessfully introduced to the Florida, Dominican Republic, St Helena, Tahiti, and Madeira. Feral and occasional breeder in England.

Odontophoridae
Mountain quail, introduced successfully to Vancouver Island in Canada and to some areas of the United States; possibly to the Hawaiian Islands; introduced unsuccessfully to New Zealand
Scaled quail, introduced successfully to some areas of the United States, and probably introduced unsuccessfully to the Hawaiian Islands
California quail, introduced successfully to New Zealand, the Hawaiian Islands, Chile, Juan Fernández, Argentina, parts of Canada and the United States, King Island and Norfolk Island in Australia; unsuccessfully introduced to Australia, Tasmania, France, Tahiti, and perhaps Fiji, Tonga and South Africa
Gambel's quail, introduced successfully in areas of the United States and to the Hawaiian Islands
Northern bobwhite, re-introduced successfully to parts of the United States; introduced successfully to Haiti, the Dominican Republic, the Bahamas, France, Italy, Japan and New Zealand; introduced successfully but now extirpated to Jamaica, Puerto Rico, Antigua, Guadeloupe, Martinique, Barbados, St Croix, St Kitts, and Bermuda; introduced unsuccessfully to Peru, Canada, the Hawaiian Islands, Ireland, Great Britain, China, and South Africa
Crested bobwhite, introduced successfully to the Grenadines and the Virgin Islands
Montezuma quail, introduced unsuccessfully to the Hawaiian Islands

Numididae
Helmeted guineafowl, introduced successfully to Hispaniola, Cuba, the Isle of Pines, Australia, and probably in Arabia, Madagascar, the Comoros, Mauritius, Agaléga Islands, Annobón, Cape Verde and Barbuda; now extirpated after successful introduction on Rodrigues; possibly successfully introduced to France, New Zealand, Australia and the Hawaiian Islands; unsuccessfully introduced to Ascension Island, the Chagos Archipelago, St Helena, Jamaica, Puerto Rico, Trinidad, Gonâve Island, Madeira, and the United States. Has bred ferally in England.

Meleagrididae
Wild turkey, successfully re-introduced to areas of the United States and Canada; introduced successfully to the Hawaiian Islands, Mauritius, Germany, New Zealand, and Tasmania; unsuccessfully introduced to Hispaniola and Fiji

Pelecaniformes

Pelecanidae
Brown pelican, successfully re-introduced to Louisiana

Phalacrocoracidae
Great cormorant, introduced unsuccessfully to the Hawaiian Islands
Guanay cormorant, possibly introduced unsuccessfully to Isla San Jerónimo, Baja California

Ciconiiformes

Ardeidae
Cattle egret, successfully introduced to the Hawaiian Islands, Chagos Archipelago, Seychelles and possibly Rodrigues Island; unsuccessfully introduced to Mauritius and Australia, which it has colonised naturally
Nankeen night heron, unsuccessfully introduced to New Zealand and Bird Island (Western Australia)
Black-crowned night heron, unsuccessfully introduced to Scotland and Norfolk, England (free-flying colonies now subject to control).

Threskiornithidae
Scarlet ibis, successfully introduced to Florida, possibly introduced unsuccessfully to Canada
Sacred ibis, successfully introduced to France, Taiwan and Florida, feral elsewhere in western Europe.
Bald ibis, successfully re-introduced to Turkey, ongoing re-introduction schemes in Austria and Spain to restore species to former range (success as yet unknown)

Phoenicopteridae
American flamingo, unsuccessfully introduced to the Hawaiian Islands
Chilean flamingo, successfully introduced to the Netherlands and Germany, occasionally feral and has bred elsewhere in western Europe including Britain.

Cathartidae
Turkey vulture, successfully introduced to Puerto Rico, Hispaniola and possibly the Bahamas
California condor, successfully re-introduced to California and Arizona

Falconiformes

Accipitridae
Griffon vulture, reintroduced into many areas of Europe
White-tailed eagle, successfully re-introduced to Scotland, possible future-reintroductions planned in southern England
Swamp harrier, successfully introduced to Tahiti
Osprey, successfully re-introduced to England (Lake District, Hampshire and Rutland Water), has naturally re-colonised Scotland and Wales.

Falconidae
Peregrine falcon, successfully re-introduced in parts of the United States
Chimango caracara, successfully introduced to Easter Island

Gruiformes

Rallidae
Weka, successfully introduced to Macquarie Island (now extirpated), Chatham Islands and other New Zealand islands
Corncrake, unsuccessfully introduced to the United States, currently being re-introduced to the Nene Washes, eastern England (success as yet unknown).
Laysan rail, unsuccessfully introduced to several islands in the Hawaiian Islands
Common moorhen, successfully introduced to St Helena
Gough Island moorhen, re-introduced, possibly successfully, to Tristan da Cunha
Purple swamphen, successfully introduced to the United States; unsuccessfully introduced to the Hawaiian Islands and possibly Argentina

Gruidae
Demoiselle crane, unsuccessfully introduced to France
Brolga, unsuccessfully introduced to Fiji

Charadriiformes

Turnicidae
Madagascar buttonquail, successfully introduced (or possibly colonised) the Glorioso Islands and Réunion; unsuccessfully introduced to Mauritius
Painted buttonquail, unsuccessfully introduced to the Hawaiian Islands and possibly to New Zealand

Laridae
Silver gull, unsuccessfully introduced to the Hawaiian Islands and Istanbul
Western gull, unsuccessfully introduced to the Hawaiian Islands

Recurvirostridae
Black-necked stilt. successfully introduced to Japan, possible subspecies of the native black-winged stilt

Charadriidae
Northern lapwing, unsuccessfully introduced to New Zealand
Grey plover, unsuccessfully introduced to New Zealand
Eurasian golden plover, unsuccessfully introduced to New Zealand

Pterocliformes

Pteroclidae
Pallas's sandgrouse, possibly successfully introduced to Mongolia; unsuccessfully introduced to the United States
Pin-tailed sandgrouse, unsuccessfully introduced to New Zealand and Australia
Black-bellied sandgrouse, unsuccessfully introduced to Nevada and perhaps Australia
Chestnut-bellied sandgrouse, successfully introduced to Hawaiian Islands; unsuccessfully introduced to Australia and perhaps to the United States

Columbiformes

Columbidae
Rock pigeon, successfully introduced in Eurasia, North Africa, North America, Central America, South America, the West Indies, the Bahamas, Bermuda, Juan Fernández, Easter Island, the Society Islands, Samoa, Fiji, the Hawaiian Islands, Australia, New Zealand, Norfolk Island, Mauritius, the Andaman and Nicobar islands, South Georgia, St Helena, the Marquesas, and probably elsewhere. Ubiquitous in cities worldwide.
Pink-headed imperial pigeon, unsuccessfully introduced to the Cocos-Keeling Islands
Wood pigeon, unsuccessfully introduced to the United States
Mourning dove, successfully introduced to the Hawaiian Islands
White-winged dove, unsuccessfully introduced to the Hawaiian Islands
Turtle dove, unsuccessfully introduced to Australia and New Zealand
Red turtle dove, possibly introduced to Malaysia and Singapore, unsuccessfully
Madagascar turtle dove, successfully introduced to Diego Garcia; possibly successfully introduced to Mauritius and Réunion (perhaps native); N. p. picturatus successfully introduced to the Seychelles and Amirantes endemic with N. p. rostratus
Eurasian collared dove successfully introduced to the United States, Puerto Rico, and Bahamas; unsuccessfully introduced to New Zealand
Barbary dove; successfully introduced to the Canary Islands (occasionally feral elsewhere in Europe, successfully introduced to the United States, possibly successfully introduced to the Hawaiian Islands and to Alice Springs in Australia
Red-eyed dove, possibly introduced to Cape Peninsula, South Africa (perhaps colonised)
Island collared dove, possibly introduced successfully in Sumatra; unsuccessfully introduced to Borneo and New Zealand
Philippine collared dove, successfully introduced to the Mariana Islands
Spotted dove, successfully introduced to eastern Indonesia, Fiji, New Britain, New Caledonia, New Zealand, the Hawaiian Islands, Australia, southern California and Mauritius
Laughing dove, successfully introduced to Western Australia
Peaceful dove and/or zebra dove, successfully introduced to St Helena, Madagascar, Mauritius, Seychelles, Réunion, Glorioso Islands, Rodrigues, Chagos Archipelago, Tahiti, the Hawaiian Islands, Thailand, Borneo, the Philippines, and possibly Cosmoledos, Farquhar, Sulawesi, and Amboina; unsuccessfully introduced to Kangaroo Island
Diamond dove, unsuccessfully introduced to New Zealand, the Hawaiian Islands, and Kangaroo Island
Bar-shouldered dove, unsuccessfully introduced to the Hawaiian Islands and Kangaroo Island
Inca dove, introduced unsuccessfully to southern Florida
Common ground dove, possibly introduced successfully to Bermuda
Namaqua dove, unsuccessfully introduced to New Zealand and Australia
Emerald dove, unsuccessfully introduced to the Hawaiian Islands and perhaps New Zealand
Common bronzewing, unsuccessfully introduced to New Zealand and the Hawaiian Islands
Crested pigeon, possibly successfully introduced to Kangaroo Island; unsuccessfully introduced to the Hawaiian Islands, New Zealand, Europe and the United States
Partridge pigeon, unsuccessfully introduced to the Hawaiian Islands and perhaps New Zealand
Spinifex pigeon, unsuccessfully introduced to the Hawaiian Islands and Kangaroo Island
White-tipped dove, unsuccessfully introduced to the Hawaiian Islands
Caribbean dove, introduced, perhaps successfully, to New Providence in the Bahamas
Ruddy quail-dove, unsuccessfully introduced to the Hawaiian Islands
Luzon bleeding-heart, unsuccessfully introduced to the United States and the Hawaiian Islands
Wonga pigeon, unsuccessfully introduced to New Zealand, Kangaroo Island and the Hawaiian Islands
Blue-headed quail-dove, unsuccessfully introduced to Jamaica and the Hawaiian Islands
Nicobar pigeon, unsuccessfully introduced to the Hawaiian Islands

Psittaciformes

Strigopidae
Kakapo, successfully, but tenuously, introduced to several islands off New Zealand

Cacatuidae
Gang-gang cockatoo, unsuccessfully introduced to Kangaroo Island
Sulphur-crested cockatoo, successfully introduced to New Zealand, Western Australia, Palau, Puerto Rico and in some Indonesian islands; unsuccessfully introduced to Singapore and the Hawaiian Islands
Yellow-crested cockatoo, successfully introduced to Singapore and Hong Kong
Moluccan cockatoo, possibly introduced to Amboina in the Moluccas; an occasional escapee in the Hawaiian Islands
Major Mitchell's cockatoo, unsuccessfully introduced to Fiji
Tanimbar corella, possibly introduced successfully to Tual in the Kai Islands, Indonesia and Singapore
Galah, unsuccessfully introduced to the Hawaiian Islands
Long-billed corella, successfully introduced to coastal Australia around urban areas; unsuccessfully introduced to the Chagos Archipelago
Cockatiel, successfully introduced to Puerto Rico, unsuccessfully introduced to the United States and New Zealand

Psittacidae
Blue-streaked lory, possibly introduced successfully to the Kai Islands and Damar Islands, Indonesia
Rainbow lorikeet, successfully introduced to Perth, Western Australia
Coconut lorikeet, successfully introduced to Hong Kong. Possible confusion with rainbow lorikeet as they were previously considered conspecific. 
Kuhl's lorikeet, successfully introduced to the Line Islands in the Pacific Ocean
Tahitian lory, possibly successfully re-introduced to Aitutaki in the Cook Islands; unsuccessfully re-introduced to Tahiti
Musk lorikeet, unsuccessfully introduced to Western Australia
Blue-and-yellow macaw, introduced successfully to Florida and Puerto Rico
Red-and-green macaw, introduced successfully to Puerto Rico
Scarlet macaw, introduced successfully to Puerto Rico, unsuccessfully introduced to the Hawaiian Islands and The Netherlands
Chestnut-fronted macaw, introduced successfully to Florida
Brown-throated parakeet, successfully introduced to the Virgin Islands and possibly the United States
Orange-fronted parakeet, possibly successfully introduced to Florida
Blue-crowned parakeet, successfully introduced to California
Red-masked parakeet, successfully introduced to California and the Hawaiian Islands
Mitred conure, successfully introduced to California and the Hawaiian Islands
Nanday conure, introduced in the United States and Puerto Rico, introduced unsuccessfully in the Hawaiian Islands
Maroon-faced parakeet, successfully possibly re-introduced to the area around Rio de Janeiro, Brazil
Monk parakeet, successfully introduced to Puerto Rico, Italy, England and the United States 
Green-rumped parrotlet, successfully introduced to Jamaica and Barbados, and possibly Curaçao and Tobago; unsuccessfully introduced to Martinique
Yellow-chevroned parakeet, successfully introduced to the United States
Canary-winged parakeet, successfully introduced to Peru, Puerto Rico, and the United States
Orange-chinned parakeet, unsuccessfully introduced to the United States and the Hawaiian Islands
Hispaniolan amazon, successfully introduced to Puerto Rico; unsuccessfully introduced to Florida
White-fronted amazon, unsuccessfully introduced to Florida
Red-crowned amazon, successfully introduced to the United States and the Hawaiian Islands
Red-lored amazon, introduced successfully to California and possibly Florida
Yellow-crowned amazon, introduced, possibly successfully, in the United States and Trinidad; unsuccessfully introduced to the Hawaiian Islands
Orange-winged amazon, successfully introduced to Puerto Rico, unsuccessfully introduced to the United States
Yellow-shouldered amazon unsuccessfully introduced to Florida
Lilac-crowned amazon introduced successfully to California; unsuccessfully introduced to Florida
Festive amazon unsuccessfully introduced to Florida
Red-spectacled amazon unsuccessfully introduced to Florida
Mealy amazon unsuccessfully introduced to Florida
Turquoise-fronted amazon introduced successfully to California, unsuccessfully introduced to Florida
Yellow-headed amazon introduced successfully to California; unsuccessfully introduced to Florida
Yellow-naped amazon unsuccessfully introduced to Florida
Meyer's parrot, successfully introduced to Cape Province in South Africa, now extirpated
Greater vasa parrot, unsuccessfully introduced to Réunion
Eclectus parrot, successfully introduced to Palau and to the Goram Islands, Indonesia; unsuccessfully introduced to the Hawaiian Islands
Blue-naped parrot, successfully introduced to the area of Borneo
Great-billed parrot, possibly introduced, successfully, to Balut Island, Indonesia
Rose-ringed parakeet, successfully introduced to Mauritius, Zanzibar, Italy, England, Oman, Yemen, Hong Kong, Macau, Japan, Kenya, Turkey, the United States, and the Hawaiian Islands; unsuccessfully introduced to Egypt, Singapore, Cape Verde and the Andaman Islands
Alexandrine parakeet, successfully introduced to Japan
Plum-headed parakeet, unsuccessfully introduced to the United States
Red shining parrot, unsuccessfully introduced to Vanuatu and Fiji
Madagascar lovebird, perhaps introduced successfully to Rodrigues, Réunion, the Comoros and the Seychelles; unsuccessfully introduced to Mauritius, Zanzibar, and the Mafia Islands, and possibly to South Africa
Peach-faced lovebird, successfully introduced to Arizona; unsuccessfully introduced to Western Australia, the Hawaiian Islands, and Florida
Fischer's lovebird, successfully introduced to the Tanga area of Tanzania and southern Kenya; unsuccessfully introduced to Florida
Masked lovebird, successfully introduced to Dar es Salaam, Tanzania and to Nairobi, Kenya and the Canary Islands; unsuccessfully introduced to the United States
Nyasa lovebird, possibly introduced successfully to Lundazi in Zambia and to Namibia
Crimson rosella, successfully introduced to Norfolk Island and New Zealand unsuccessfully introduced to Lord Howe Island and Western Australia
Eastern rosella, successfully introduced to New Zealand and possibly near Adelaide, South Australia
Pale-headed rosella, introduced unsuccessfully to the Hawaiian Islands
Yellow-fronted parakeet, possibly successfully re-introduced to Stephens Island, New Zealand
Budgerigar, successfully introduced to the United States, Japan and Puerto Rico, unsuccessfully introduced to England, South Africa, the Hawaiian Islands, Hong Kong, South America and New Zealand

Strigiformes

Tytonidae
Barn owl, successfully introduced to the Seychelles, the Hawaiian Islands, and possibly St Helena; unsuccessfully introduced to New Zealand [self introduced to North Island] and Lord Howe Island
Masked owl, successfully introduced to Lord Howe Island

Strigidae
Eurasian eagle-owl, re-introduced to parts of Sweden, possibly successfully introduced (or natural coloniser) to England.
Southern boobook, unsuccessfully introduced to New Zealand (Australian race) and Lord Howe Island
Little owl, successfully introduced to England and New Zealand
Tawny owl, unsuccessfully introduced to New Zealand

Apodiformes

Apodidae
Mariana swiftlet, successfully introduced to the Hawaiian Islands
Edible-nest swiftlet, possibly successfully introduced to Burma; unsuccessfully introduced to the Hawaiian Islands

Trochilidae
Many hummingbirds of unknown species have been introduced to Brazil, Ecuador, Peru and Venezuela, although none are believed to have been successful

Coraciiformes

Alcedinidae
Laughing kookaburra, successfully introduced to Western Australia, Kangaroo Island, Flinders Island in Tasmania and New Zealand; unsuccessfully introduced to Fiji

Passeriformes

Tyrannidae
Great kiskadee, successfully introduced to Bermuda

Menuridae
Superb lyrebird, successfully introduced to Tasmania

Alaudidae
Mongolian lark, unsuccessfully introduced to the Hawaiian Islands
Wood lark, unsuccessfully introduced to the United States and perhaps to Australia and New Zealand
Skylark, successfully introduced to New Zealand, Australia, Tasmania, Kangaroo Island, Lord Howe Island, the Hawaiian Islands and Canada; unsuccessfully introduced to the United States

Pycnonotidae
Red-whiskered bulbul, successfully introduced to Japan, Malaysia, Singapore, the Nicobar Islands, Mauritius, Réunion, Australia, the United States, and the Hawaiian Islands, and perhaps to Sumatra and Java
Red-vented bulbul, successfully introduced to Fiji, Samoa, Tonga, United States and the Hawaiian Islands; unsuccessfully introduced to Australia and New Zealand
Sooty-headed bulbul, introduced, perhaps successfully, to Sumatra and Sulawesi; introduced unsuccessfully to Singapore
Réunion bulbul, unsuccessfully introduced to Diego Garcia in the Chagos Archipelago
White-eared bulbul, successfully introduced to the Arabian Peninsula

Cinclidae
White-throated dipper, unsuccessfully introduced to the United States

Mimidae
Northern mockingbird, successfully introduced to the Hawaiian Islands; unsuccessfully introduced to Bermuda, Barbados, St Helena, Tahiti and the northern United States
Tropical mockingbird, possibly successfully introduced to Caucatal in Colombia and Panama; unsuccessfully introduced to Barbados and Nevis

Prunellidae
Dunnock, successfully introduced to New Zealand; unsuccessfully introduced to the United States

Turdidae
Western bluebird, unsuccessfully introduced to Tahiti
Hermit thrush, unsuccessfully introduced to Australia
Blackbird, successfully introduced to Australia, Tasmania, Lord Howe Island, Norfolk Island and New Zealand; unsuccessfully introduced to South Africa, St Helena, the United States and Fiji
Island thrush, successfully introduced to the Cocos-Keeling Islands, now extirpated
Song thrush, successfully introduced to Australia, Norfolk Island and Lord Howe Island and New Zealand; unsuccessfully introduced to South Africa, St Helena and the United States
American robin, unsuccessfully introduced to Great Britain, though they are vagrants to Greenland and mainland Europe
Red-legged thrush, unsuccessfully introduced to Grand Cayman Island in the West Indies

Sylviidae
Japanese bush warbler, successfully introduced to the Hawaiian Islands
Whitethroat, unsuccessfully introduced to New Zealand
Blackcap, unsuccessfully introduced to the United States and probably New Zealand

Muscicapidae
European robin, unsuccessfully introduced to Australia, New Zealand, Canada, and the United States
Japanese robin, unsuccessfully introduced to the Hawaiian Islands
Ryūkyū robin, unsuccessfully introduced to the Hawaiian Islands
Nightingale, unsuccessfully introduced to Australia, New Zealand, the United States and South Africa
Oriental magpie robin, introduced, perhaps successfully, to the Hawaiian Islands
White-rumped shama, successfully introduced to the Hawaiian Islands
Seychelles magpie robin, unsuccessfully introduced to Alphonse Island in the Amirantes
Blue-and-white flycatcher, unsuccessfully introduced to the Hawaiian Islands
Narcissus flycatcher, unsuccessfully introduced to the Hawaiian Islands

Timaliidae
White-crested laughingthrush, unsuccessfully introduced to the Hawaiian Islands
Greater necklaced laughingthrush, successfully introduced to the Hawaiian Islands
Black-throated laughingthrush, unsuccessfully introduced to the Hawaiian Islands
Hwamei, successfully introduced to the Hawaiian Islands, Japan and Taiwan, unsuccessfully introduced to the United States
White-browed laughingthrush, possibly successfully introduced to Hong Kong
Moustached laughingthrush, successfully introduced to Japan
Red-billed leiothrix, successfully introduced to the Hawaiian Islands, Italy, France. Japan and perhaps Hong Kong; feral elsewhere in western Europe; unsuccessfully introduced to Australia, Tahiti, Colombia and the United States

Maluridae
Superb fairy-wren, unsuccessfully introduced to New Zealand

Paridae
Great tit, successfully introduced to the United States (Illinois and Wisconsin)
Varied tit, introduced, perhaps successfully, to the Hawaiian Islands
Blue tit, unsuccessfully introduced to Canada and New Zealand

Zosteropidae
Silvereye, successfully introduced to Tahiti; unsuccessfully introduced to Lord Howe Island
Japanese white-eye, successfully introduced to the Hawaiian Islands
Swinhoe's white-eye, successfully introduced to California
Christmas Island white-eye, successfully introduced to the Cocos-Keeling Islands

Meliphagidae
Noisy miner, unsuccessfully introduced to the Solomon Islands, unsuccessfully introduced to New Zealand

Dicruridae
Magpie-lark, unsuccessfully introduced to New Zealand, the Hawaiian Islands and Fiji
Willie wagtail, unsuccessfully introduced to the Hawaiian Islands
Black drongo, successfully introduced to Guam and Rota Island in the southern Mariana Islands

Callaeidae
Saddleback, introduced and re-introduced successfully to many islands off New Zealand for the preservation of this rare species

Artamidae
Australian magpie, successfully introduced to New Zealand, the Solomon Islands, Fiji, and possibly to King Island, Flinders Island and Kangaroo Island; unsuccessfully introduced to Sri Lanka and to Rottnest Island
Grey currawong, unsuccessfully introduced to Fiji

Paradisaeidae
Greater bird-of-paradise, unsuccessfully introduced to the West Indies (due to overhunting by humans)

Corvidae
Red-billed blue magpie, introduced, possibly successfully, to the Hawaiian Islands
Korean magpie, successfully introduced to Kyūshū, Japan
Jackdaw, unsuccessfully introduced to New Zealand
House crow, successfully introduced to the Netherlands [extirpated], Israel, Egypt (all ship-assisted colonisers), Malaysia, Singapore, Kenya, Zanzibar, Yemen, Djibouti, Sudan and South Africa; introduced, probably successfully, to Thailand, Pemba Island in east Africa, Oman and Mauritius; unsuccessfully introduced to the Andaman Islands and Australia
New Caledonian crow, successfully introduced to the Maré Island in New Caledonia
Rook, successfully introduced to New Zealand
American crow, unsuccessfully introduced to Bermuda (now a successful colonist)
Large-billed crow, unsuccessfully introduced to the Nicobar Islands
Pied crow, unsuccessfully introduced to Mauritius

Sturnidae
White-headed starling, unsuccessfully introduced to Camorta Island in the Nicobar Islands
Rosy starling, unsuccessfully introduced to Mauritius
European starling, successfully introduced to the United States, South America (Brazil, Uruguay and Argentina) Jamaica, South Africa, Australia, New Zealand, and the Chatham Islands, and Fiji and Tonga; unsuccessfully introduced to Cuba and Venezuela
Pied myna, successfully introduced to Japan
Black-collared starling, unsuccessfully introduced to the Hawaiian Islands
Common myna, successfully introduced to Australia, New Zealand, South Africa, St Helena, Seychelles, Réunion, Rodrigues, Mauritius, the Comoros, Madagascar, Chagos Archipelago, Ascension Island, Solomon Islands, New Caledonia, Fiji, the Society Islands, the Cook Islands, the United States, the Hawaiian Islands, France, Balearic Islands, widely throughout Asia and probably to the Nicobar Islands, the Laccadive Islands, the Maldives and Vanuatu; unsuccessfully introduced to the Andaman Islands and England
Javan myna, successfully introduced to Puerto Rico
Jungle myna, successfully introduced to Fiji and Samoa, and perhaps Singapore, Sumatra and the Andaman Islands; unsuccessfully introduced to Christmas Island (near Australia)
Crested myna, successfully introduced to Malaysia, the Philippines, Portugal (Lisbon area), Japan, and Canada (now extirpated)
Common hill myna, successfully introduced to the United States and Puerto Rico, unsuccessfully introduced to Christmas Island and the Hawaiian Islands, and perhaps also St Helena, the Chagos Archipelago and Hong Kong
Bank myna, successfully introduced into the Middle East, Maldives, Taiwan and Japan.

Passeridae
House sparrow, successfully introduced to the United States, Canada, Puerto Rico, Argentina, Uruguay, Brazil, Chile, Peru, Ecuador, Easter Island, Falkland Islands, Cuba, Hawaiian Islands, Eastern Australia, New Zealand, New Caledonia, South Africa, Mozambique, Somalia, Sudan, Zanzibar, Amirantes, Mauritius, Réunion, Rodrigues, Chagos Archipelago, Azores, Cape Verde, and colonised from these Mexico, Guatemala, Paraguay, Bermuda, Norfolk Island, Namibia, Botswana, Zimbabwe, and Zambia; probably introduced successfully to the Comoros, the Seychelles, Vanuatu and Kenya; unsuccessfully introduced to Jamaica, the Bahamas, St Helena, Greenland, Western Australia, the Philippines, Papua New Guinea and South Georgia Island
Spanish sparrow, introduced (or possibly colonised) to the Canary Islands, Cape Verde and Madeira
Tree sparrow, successfully introduced to the Philippines, Mariana Islands, Lesser Sunda Islands, Sulawesi, Pescadores, Australia, the central United States and eastern Malaysia, as well as (possibly) Singapore; unsuccessfully introduced to New Zealand and Bermuda

Ploceidae
Scaly weaver, unsuccessfully introduced to St Helena
Cape weaver, unsuccessfully introduced to Mauritius
Village weaver, successfully introduced to Portugal, Venezuela, Mauritius, Puerto Rico, Haiti and the Dominican Republic, and probably to Réunion; possibly colonised or introduced to São Tomé; unsuccessfully introduced to Cape Verde
Black-headed weaver, possibly introduced successfully to São Tomé, successfully to Iberia. 
Asian golden weaver, unsuccessfully introduced to the Cocos-Keeling Islands
Baya weaver, unsuccessfully introduced to the Hawaiian Islands and Hong Kong
Streaked weaver, successfully introduced onto the Arabian Peninsula
Red-billed quelea. successfully introduced to Réunion
Madagascar fody, successfully introduced to the Amirantes, Seychelles, Chagos Archipelago, Mauritius, Réunion, Rodrigues and St Helena, and possibly the Comoros and Glorioso Islands (perhaps colonised)
Seychelles fody, unsuccessfully introduced to the Amirante Islands
Yellow-crowned bishop, successfully introduced to Puerto Rico and Portugal, introduced to the Hawaiian Islands (uncertain status)
Northern red bishop, successfully introduced to California, unsuccessfully introduced to Australia, the Hawaiian Islands, Tahiti and St Helena
White-winged widowbird, unsuccessfully introduced to Australia and St Helena
Long-tailed widowbird, unsuccessfully introduced to St Helena

Estrildidae
Green-winged pytilia, unsuccessfully introduced to St Helena
Red-billed firefinch, unsuccessfully introduced to Tahiti and perhaps the Hawaiian Islands
Blue-breasted cordon-bleu, introduced possibly successfully to Zanzibar; unsuccessfully introduced to Tahiti, St Helena and the Hawaiian Islands
Red-cheeked cordon-bleu, successfully introduced to the Hawaiian Islands; unsuccessfully introduced to Cape Verde and Tahiti
Blue-capped cordon-bleu, perhaps successfully introduced to the Hawaiian Islands
Violet-eared waxbill, unsuccessfully introduced to St Helena
Lavender waxbill, successfully introduced to the Hawaiian Islands
Yellow-bellied waxbill, unsuccessfully introduced to St Helena
Orange-cheeked waxbill, successfully introduced to Puerto Rico, California and the Hawaiian Islands; unsuccessfully introduced to Tahiti
Common waxbill, successfully introduced to St Helena, Mauritius, Ascension Island, Rodrigues, Amirantes, Seychelles, Réunion, Cape Verde, São Tomé, New Caledonia, Tahiti, Brazil, Puerto Rico, the Hawaiian Islands, Portugal and Spain, unsuccessfully introduced to Madagascar, the Comoros, Príncipe, and Fiji
Black-rumped waxbill, successfully introduced to Portugal and the Hawaiian Islands; unsuccessfully introduced to Tahiti
Black-cheeked waxbill, unsuccessfully introduced to St Helena
Red avadavat, successfully introduced to Sumatra, the Philippines, Japan, Réunion, Hawaiian Islands, Fiji and Egypt, Iberian Peninsula, Italy, and perhaps Hong Kong; unsuccessfully introduced to Singapore, the Andaman Islands, Mauritius, the Comoros, Sri Lanka and Tahiti
Green avadavat, unsuccessfully introduced to Lahore, Pakistan
Zebra waxbill, unsuccessfully introduced to Tahiti and St Helena
Red-browed firetail, successfully introduced to Tahiti; unsuccessfully introduced to New Zealand, Western Australia, Fiji and New Caledonia
Diamond firetail, unsuccessfully introduced to New Zealand, Tahiti, Fiji and the Hawaiian Islands
Star finch, unsuccessfully introduced to Tahiti
Plum-headed finch, unsuccessfully introduced to Tahiti
Zebra finch, unsuccessfully introduced to New Zealand, Tahiti, Nauru and Kangaroo Island
Double-barred finch, unsuccessfully introduced to Tahiti
Long-tailed finch, unsuccessfully introduced to Tahiti
Pin-tailed parrotfinch, unsuccessfully introduced to Tahiti
Blue-faced parrotfinch, unsuccessfully introduced to Tahiti
Red-throated parrotfinch, unsuccessfully introduced to Tahiti
Red-headed parrotfinch, unsuccessfully introduced to Tahiti
Gouldian finch, unsuccessfully introduced to Tahiti
Indian silverbill, unsuccessfully introduced to Puerto Rico
African silverbill, successfully introduced to the Hawaiian Islands, Portugal and Qatar
Bronze mannikin, successfully introduced to Puerto Rico; unsuccessfully introduced to Tahiti
Magpie mannikin, successfully introduced to Zanzibar (or perhaps colonised); unsuccessfully introduced to Tahiti
Scaly-breasted munia, successfully introduced to Australia, Hawaiian Islands, Puerto Rico, US, Palau, Mauritius and Réunion; unsuccessfully introduced to the Seychelles, Tahiti and New Zealand; successfully possibly introduced to Singapore
Javan munia, successfully introduced to Singapore
Black-headed munia, successfully introduced to Japan, the Moluccas, Palau, Guam and the Hawaiian Islands; unsuccessfully introduced to Japan, Australia and Tahiti
White-rumped munia, successfully introduced to Japan, unsuccessfully introduced to Réunion
Chestnut-breasted munia, successfully introduced to the Society Islands and New Caledonia; unsuccessfully introduced to New Zealand and Western Australia
Java sparrow, successfully introduced to parts of Indochina, China, Burma, Malaysia, Singapore, Thailand, Sri Lanka, Borneo, Lesser Sunda Islands, Sulawesi, Moluccas, Philippines, Christmas Island, Cocos-Keeling Islands, Tanzania, Zanzibar, Hawaiian Islands, Fiji, Japan, Taiwan, St Helena and Puerto Rico; unsuccessfully introduced to Mauritius, the Comoros, India, Seychelles, Florida in the United States, Australia and New Zealand
Tricoloured munia, successfully introduced to Japan

Viduidae
Village indigobird, unsuccessfully introduced to the Hawaiian Islands
Shaft-tailed whydah, unsuccessfully introduced to St Helena
Pin-tailed whydah, introduced successfully to Japan, Puerto Rico and US, unsuccessfully introduced to Mayotte the Hawaiian Islands;
Eastern paradise whydah, unsuccessfully introduced to St Helena

Fringillidae
Common chaffinch, successfully introduced to New Zealand and South Africa; unsuccessfully introduced to Australia and the United States
Brambling, unsuccessfully introduced to Australia and New Zealand
Canary, successfully introduced to the Hawaiian Islands; unsuccessfully introduced to Australia, the United States, Bermuda, New Zealand, England, and Italy, hasn't established to Puerto Rico yet, as well as being frequently feral in other areas
Cape canary, successfully introduced to Réunion; unsuccessfully introduced to Mauritius, St Helena and Tahiti
White-rumped seedeater, unsuccessfully introduced to the Hawaiian Islands
Yellow-fronted canary, successfully introduced to Mauritius, Réunion, Rodrigues and the Hawaiian Islands; unsuccessfully introduced to the Amirantes and St Helena
Yellow canary, successfully introduced to St Helena and Ascension Island
European greenfinch, successfully introduced to Australia, New Zealand, Uruguay and the Azores; unsuccessfully introduced to St Helena and the United States
Eurasian siskin, unsuccessfully introduced to New Zealand, Australia and the United States
American goldfinch, unsuccessfully introduced to Bermuda and Tahiti
Lesser goldfinch, unsuccessfully introduced to Cuba
European goldfinch, successfully introduced to Cape Verde, Australia, New Zealand, Uruguay, Argentina and Bermuda; the United States [Great Lakes, New York and Southern California], unsuccessfully to Canada and South Africa
Lesser redpoll, successfully introduced to New Zealand
Twite, unsuccessfully introduced to New Zealand
Linnet, unsuccessfully introduced to New Zealand, Australia, Canada and the United States
House finch, successfully introduced to the eastern United States and Hawaiian Islands
Parrot crossbill, unsuccessfully introduced to the United States
Eurasian bullfinch, unsuccessfully introduced to the New Zealand, Australia and the United States
Hawfinch, unsuccessfully introduced to Australia
Antillean euphonia, unsuccessfully introduced to Vieques Island in Puerto Rico

Drepanididae
Laysan finch, introduced (probably for conservation purposes) successfully to several islands in the Hawaiian Islands

Thraupidae
White-lined tanager, unsuccessfully introduced to Tahiti
Summer tanager, unsuccessfully introduced to New Zealand
Scarlet tanager, unsuccessfully introduced to Tahiti
Silver-beaked tanager, unsuccessfully introduced to Tahiti
Brazilian tanager, unsuccessfully introduced to Tahiti
Crimson-backed tanager, successfully introduced to Tahiti
Blue-gray tanager, successfully introduced to Peru; unsuccessfully introduced to the United States and Tahiti
Golden tanager, unsuccessfully introduced to Tahiti
Masked tanager, unsuccessfully introduced to Tahiti
Red-legged honeycreeper, probably introduced successfully to Cuba; unsuccessfully introduced to Tahiti

Emberizidae
Yellowhammer, successfully introduced to New Zealand; unsuccessfully introduced to Australia and the United States
Ortolan bunting, unsuccessfully introduced to New Zealand and Australia
Cirl bunting, successfully introduced to New Zealand
Reed bunting, unsuccessfully introduced to New Zealand
Rufous-collared sparrow, unsuccessfully introduced to the Falkland Islands
Common diuca-finch, successfully introduced to Easter Island
Saffron finch, successfully introduced to Jamaica, Panama, the Hawaiian Islands and probably Tobago
Grassland yellow-finch, successfully introduced to Barbados, from whence it has colonised several other West Indies islands
White-collared seedeater, unsuccessfully introduced to Cuba
Cuban grassquit, successfully introduced to New Providence in the Bahamas
Yellow-faced grassquit, successfully introduced to the Hawaiian Islands; successfully possibly introduced to New Providence in the Bahamas
Puerto Rican bullfinch, introduced (status unknown) to the island of St John in the Virgin Islands
Yellow cardinal, unsuccessfully introduced to the Hawaiian Islands
Red-crested cardinal, successfully introduced to the Hawaiian Islands and Japan, and possibly South Africa and the United States
Red-cowled cardinal, unsuccessfully introduced to the Hawaiian Islands
Red-capped cardinal, unsuccessfully introduced to the Hawaiian Islands
Yellow-billed cardinal, successfully introduced to the Hawaiian Islands

Cardinalidae
Northern cardinal, successfully introduced to California, the Hawaiian Islands and Bermuda; unsuccessfully introduced to Tahiti and Australia
Indigo bunting, unsuccessfully introduced to the Hawaiian Islands
Painted bunting, unsuccessfully introduced to the Hawaiian Islands
Orange-breasted bunting, unsuccessfully introduced to the Hawaiian Islands

Icteridae
Spot-breasted oriole, successfully introduced to Florida
Troupial, successfully introduced to Puerto Rico and St Thomas in the Virgin Islands; unsuccessfully introduced to Jamaica, Trinidad, Antigua, Dominica and Grenada, where all are probably aviary escapees
Yellow-hooded blackbird, introduced, perhaps successfully, around Lima in Peru
Red-breasted meadowlark, unsuccessfully introduced to Easter Island
Long-tailed meadowlark, unsuccessfully introduced to the Hawaiian Islands
Western meadowlark, successfully introduced to the Hawaiian Islands; possibly unsuccessfully introduced to New Zealand
Carib grackle, successfully introduced to Antigua and Barbuda, St Kitts and Saint Martin in the Netherlands Antilles, and possibly Tobago
Shiny cowbird, its range has extended to Chile, the Caribbean and North America mostly naturally but facilitated through pet trade

See also
Avian range expansion
Introduced species
List of bird species introduced to the Hawaiian Islands
List of introduced mammal species
List of introduced species
List of non-native birds of Great Britain

References

California's Plants and Animals: Terrestrial Vertebrates Introduced Into California
Florida's Exotic Wildlife: status for 196 Bird species
Long, John L. (1981). Introduced Birds of the World. Agricultural Protection Board of Western Australia, 21-493
National Invasive Species Council

Introduced birds
Introduced
Introduced birds
Bird ecology
birds